The 2008 USL Premier Development League season was the 14th season of the PDL. The regular season started on April 26, 2008, and ended on July 20, 2008. The playoffs began on July 22, 2008, and ended with the PDL Championship Game on August 9, 2008.

Thunder Bay Chill finished the season as national champions, beating Laredo Heat on penalty kicks after a 1–1 tie in the PDL Championship game in Laredo, Texas on 9 August 2008.

Michigan Bucks finished with the best regular season record in the league, winning 13 out of their 16 games, suffering just one loss, and finishing with a +27 goal difference.

Yakima Reds striker Junior Garcia was the league's top scorer and MVP, knocking in 15 goals. Fresno Fuego's Fabricio Codeceira led the league with 13 assists, while Austin Aztex U23 keeper Miguel Gallardo enjoyed the best goalkeeping statistics, with a goals-against average of 0.615 per game, and keeping 9 clean sheets in his 13 games.

Changes from 2007

Name changes
Abbotsford Rangers changed their name to the Abbotsford Mariners to reflect the name of their parent organization.
Los Angeles Storm changed their name to the Los Angeles Legends to reflect the name of their parent organization.
The expansion Austin Stampede were renamed the Aztex U23 after the Austin Aztex USL-1 franchise was announced for 2009 and acquired controlling interest in the PDL team.

New franchises
Nine franchises joined the league this year, including six brand new teams:

Folding
Five teams left the league prior to the beginning of the season:
Albany Admirals - Schenectady, New York
Austin Lightning - Austin, Texas
Cocoa Expos - Cocoa, Florida
Delaware Dynasty - New Castle, Delaware
Sioux Falls Spitfire - Sioux Falls, South Dakota

Final standings

Central Conference

Great Lakes Division

Midwest Division

Heartland Division

The top two teams in each division qualify for the playoffs.  The Conference champion receives a bye into the Conference Semifinals, with the third place team from that division receiving a playoff berth.

Eastern Conference

Mid Atlantic Division

New England Division

Northeast Division 

The Division Champions and the Second Place team with the most points qualify for the playoffs.

Southern Conference

Mid South Division

Southeast Division

Western Conference

Northwest Division

Southwest Division 

The top two teams in each division qualify for the playoffs.

Playoffs

The Divisional Round for the Central Conference took place July 22–23, 2008, with the Conference Championships taking place between July 25–27.  The PDL Semifinals took place on August 2, and the final was played on August 9.

Playoff bracket

Divisional round

Conference semifinals

Conference finals

PDL semifinals

PDL final

Awards and All-League team
F: Carlos Araujo (Central Florida Kraze); Felix Garcia (Laredo Heat) (U19 Player of the Year); Junior Garcia (Yakima Reds) (league MVP)
M: Will Beaugé (Ottawa Fury); Fabricio Codeceira (Fresno Fuego); Adam Gazda (Reading Rage); Nate Jafta (Michigan Bucks)
D: Darrius Barnes (Cary RailHawks U23's); Mike Holody (Michigan Bucks); Norberto Papandrea (Austin Aztex U23) (Defender of the Year)
G: Miguel Gallardo (Austin Aztex U23) (Goalkeeper of the Year)
Coach: Wolfgang Suhnholz (Austin Aztex U23)

See also
United Soccer Leagues 2008

USL League Two seasons
4